Joseph "Joe Iron Man" Ardizzone (born Giuseppe Ernesto Ardizzone; ; November 19, 1884 – disappeared October 15, 1931, declared dead 1938) was an Italian-born early Los Angeles mobster, who became the first Boss of the Los Angeles crime family. He was involved in a long-standing feud with the Matranga family. He once claimed to have killed 30 men.

Early life
Ardizzone was born on November 19, 1884 in Piana dei Greci (today Piana degli Albanesi), in the Province of Palermo, Sicily, to Antonino Ardizzone. The Ardizzones were of Arbëreshë origin, being related to several other families and they would maintain contact in America. Those families included the Cuccias and the Matrangas.

Early years in America
The Ardizzone family came to America at different times. Antonino came in the later 19th century, landing in Louisiana then taking the train to southern California. He became a wealthy farmer and wine maker. His other children, including Stefano and Francesco also moved to the Los Angeles area. Giuseppe was one of the last to arrive.

Matranga feud

For reasons uncertain Giuseppe, who Americanized his name to Joseph, became involved in a dispute with the Matrangas who lived in Los Angeles. They were distant cousins from Piana dei Greci. In what he later called an act of self-defense, Joseph shot and killed a Matranga ally named George Maisano in 1906.  He then fled California and hid in different states.

He eventually returned and was arrested, but the charges against him were dropped. In December 1914, he then married Elsa Marie Ellenberger who was the daughter of a German neighbor in the city of Sunland, California where they lived at that time. In court documents, she had also been referred to as Elsie A. Ardizzone. Shortly after that their home was burned down by arsonists.

Starting in 1917, three of the rival Matrangas were killed: Sam Matranga was shot in front of his home (1837 Darwin Avenue); his brother Pietro Matranga was also shot in front of his home (1510 Biggy Street) a month later. Then a relative of the Matrangas, Joseph LaPaglia, was also killed. On October 12, 1918, Tony Matranga fired a rifle at Stephen Ardizzone which hit his truck; Matranga was tried on a charge of assault with a deadly weapon.

Later life
While it is uncertain when Ardizzone became a member of the Mafia, or even if his immediate family were members, he was in a leadership position in the early 1920s. Upon the resignation of Rosario DeSimone for unknown reasons, he became the next chief of the Los Angeles crime family.

During his time as boss Prohibition was active and many, if not most, Mafiosi were involved in bootlegging. The Los Angeles Family was certainly active during this time period.

In 1931, when the Castellammarese War between Joseph Masseria and Salvatore Maranzano was taking place, the Los Angeles crime family may have supported Maranzano. Nick Gentile notes in his memoirs that during a conference Maranzano was backed by two men from California. Joseph Bonanno (died 2002) and his son Salvatore Bonanno (died 2008) wrote of several close associates in the Los Angeles area, such as Jimmy Costa (from Castellammare del Golfo), Nick Guastella, Frank Bompensiero and Tony Mirabile.

It was also during this time that a faction developed that opposed Ardizzone. In early 1931 he was driving with his friend Jimmy Basile when gunmen drove by and shot at them. Basile was killed and Ardizzone wounded. Ardizzone managed to be taken to the house of Leon DeSimone, the physician son of former L.A. don Rosario DeSimone. He was treated and sent to a hospital. A second attempt was made on his life in the hospital, so his family came to act as bodyguards. Underworld sources indicated that he agreed to retire after these incidents.

The opposing faction apparently did not believe Ardizzone, and on October 15, 1931, while on his way to a cousin's house in Etiwanda, driving a 1930 Ford Coupe SRW7653 and carrying a .41 caliber Colt revolver No.323 he "disappeared". An intense search followed, but his body was never found. After seven years, Ardizzone's wife had him declared legally dead.

See also
List of people who disappeared

Notes

References
California Assembly, Interim Committee on Judiciary. Organized Crime in California—Report of the Subcommittee on Rackets.  Sacramento, 1959.
Gentile, Nick, with Felice Chilanti. Vita di Capomafia. Rome: Editori Riuniti, 1963.
State of California. Final report of the Special Crime Study Commission on Organized Crime. Sacramento, 1953.
Warner, Richard N. "The First Mafia Boss of Los Angeles? The Mystery of Vito Di Giorgio, 1880–1922." On The Spot Journal (Summer 2008), 46-54.

1884 births
1938 deaths
1930s missing person cases
American crime bosses
American people of Albanian descent
American people of Arbëreshë descent
Italian people of Arbëreshë descent
American gangsters of Italian descent
Gangsters from Los Angeles
Italian emigrants to the United States
Italian gangsters
Los Angeles crime family
Missing gangsters
Missing  person cases in California
Murdered American gangsters of Sicilian descent
People declared dead in absentia
People from Piana degli Albanesi
People murdered by the Los Angeles crime family
People murdered in California
Prohibition-era gangsters